The archaeology of the Americas is the study of the archaeology of the Western Hemisphere, including North America (Mesoamerica), Central America, South America and the Caribbean.  This includes the study of pre-historic/Pre-Columbian and historic indigenous American peoples, as well as historical archaeology of more recent eras, including the Trans-Atlantic slave trade and European colonization.

Chronology
The Pre-Columbian era is the term generally used to encompass all time period subdivisions in the history of the Americas spanning the time from the original settlement of the Americas in the Upper Paleolithic until the European colonization of the Americas during the early modern period. While technically referring to the era before the voyages of Christopher Columbus from AD 1492 to 1504, in practice the term usually includes the history of American indigenous cultures until the 18th or 19th century. In more recent decades, archaeological scholarship has extended to include enslaved Africans and European and Asian migrant populations.

The pre-Columbian archaeological record in the Americas has conventionally been divided into five phases based on an enduring system established by Gordon Willey and Philip Phillips's 1958 book Method and Theory in American Archaeology. Their chronology differs from old world prehistory from Europe and Asia which uses the three-age system, with the Stone Age divided into Paleolithic, Mesolithic, Neolithic, and Chalcolithic, followed by the Bronze Age and Iron Age, remain in general use.

Numerous regional and sub-regional divisions have since been defined to distinguish various cultures through time and space, as later archaeologists recognized that these generalised stages did not adequately correspond to the cultural variation that existed in different locations in the Americas.
 Lithic stage
Defined by the ostensible prevalence of big-game hunting. In most places, this can be dated to before 8000 BCE, starting most probably around 16,500 BCE (see Paleo-Indians). Examples include the Clovis culture and Folsom tradition groups.
 The Archaic stage
Defined by the increasingly intensive gathering of wild resources with the decline of the big-game hunting lifestyle. Typically, Archaic cultures can be dated from 8000 to 1000 BCE. Examples include the Archaic Southwest, the Arctic small tool tradition, the Poverty Point culture, and the Chan-Chan culture in southern Chile.
 The Formative stage
Defined as "village agriculture" based. Most of these can be dated from 1000 BCE to 500 CE. Examples include the Dorset culture, Zapotec civilization, Mimbres culture, Olmec, Woodland, and Mississippian cultures.
 The Classic stage

Defined as "early civilizations", and typically dating from 500 to 1200 CE. Willey and Phillips considered only cultures from Mesoamerica and Peru to have achieved this level of complexity. Examples include the early Maya and the Toltec.
 The Post-Classic stage
Defined as "later prehispanic civilizations" and typically dated from 1200 CE until the advent of European colonisation. The late Maya, the Incan civilization, and the Aztec cultures were Post-Classic.

Today, for Meso- and Andean South America, the later periods are more often classified using the "Horizon" terminology, with "Early Horizon" typically broadly equating to the Late Formative stage.  "Horizons" are periods of cultural stability and political unity, with "Intermediate periods" covering the politically fragmented transition between them.  In the Andes, there are three Horizon periods, with two Intermediate periods between them. The Horizons, and their dominant cultures are: Early Horizon, Chavin; Middle Horizon, Tiwanaku and Wari culture; Late Horizon, Inca.

Major regions

North America

NAGPRA 
Since 1990, in the United States, physical anthropology and archaeological investigations based on the study of human remains are influenced by the Native American Graves Protection and Repatriation Act, (NAGPRA), which provides for the bodies of Native Americans and associated grave goods to be turned over to the recognized tribal body most legally affiliated with the remains; the law applies only to culturally identifiable remains and artefacts found on federally owned public land. In some cases, notably, that of Kennewick Man, these laws have been subject to close judicial scrutiny and great intellectual conflict.

Mesoamerica

Mesoamerica is a region and cultural area in the Americas, extending approximately from central Mexico to Honduras and Nicaragua, within which a number of pre-Columbian societies flourished before the Spanish colonization of the Americas in the 15th and 16th centuries. Prehistoric groups in this area are characterized by agricultural villages and large ceremonial and politico-religious capitals This culture area included some of the most complex and advanced cultures of the Americas, including the Olmec, Teotihuacan, the Maya, and the Aztec, the most powerful tribe of Mesoamerica in their time.

South America
Important South American societies include the Moche, the Inca, the Wari.

Important South American archaeological sites include: Pikillaqta, Machu Picchu, Tiwanaku, and Monte Verde.

Central America 
Central America is a region and cultural area in the Americas located south of Mesoamerica extending from Nicaragua to the southern border of Panama. Important sites include the Stone Spheres of Costa Rica.

Archaeogenetics

Molecular genetics study suggests that surviving Amerindian populations derived from a theoretical single founding population, possibly from  only 50 to 70 genetic contributors  Preliminary research, restricted to only 9 genomic regions (or loci) have shown a genetic link between  original Americas and Asia populations. The study does not address the question of separate migrations for these groups, and excludes other DNA data-sets.

The  American Journal of Human Genetics released an article in 2007  stating "Here we show, by using 86 complete mitochondrial genomes, that all Indigenous American haplogroups, including Haplogroup X (mtDNA), were part of a single founding population." Amerindian groups in the Bering Strait region exhibit perhaps the strongest DNA or mitochondrial DNA relations to Siberian peoples. The genetic diversity of Amerindian indigenous groups  increase with distance from the assumed entry point into the Americas. Certain genetic diversity patterns from West to East  suggest at least some coastal migration events.  Geneticists have variously estimated that peoples of Asia and the Americas were part of the same population from 42,000 to 21,000 years ago.

Archaeological finds 

In February 2021, archaeologists from the University of Buenos Aires–National Scientific and Technical Research Council announced the discovery of 12 graves dated to 6,000-1,300 years ago in Argentine Northwest. Researchers also revealed necklaces and pendants next to some of the bodies. According to archaeologist Leticia Cortés, there were many kinds of burial methods, in individual or collective graves, and also in the posture of the bodies. Some were hyperflexed, like squatting, with the shoulders touching the knees.

In 2018, 9000-year-old remains of a female hunter along with a toolkit of projectile points and animal processing implements were discovered at the Andean site of Wilamaya Patjxa, Puno District in Peru.

In September 2021, archaeologists announced the remains of eight 800-year-old bodies nearby ancient town of Chilca. Bodies included adults and children who were covered in plant material before being buried. Some dishes and musical instruments were uncovered as well. Researchers think remains belong to the Chilca culture, which was apart from other pre-Hispanic cultures in the area.

A mummy that is approximately 800 years old that is believed to be of pre-Inca cultures was found at the site of Cajamarquilla in Peru in November 2021. Researchers reported that the mummy was tied with strings, covering his face with his hands, so they assumed it was a southern Peruvian funeral custom. In February 2022, archaeologists announced the discovery of six mummified children thought to have been sacrificed, probably to accompany a dead elite man to the afterlife. According to archaeologist Pieter Van Dalen, 1,000-1,200 years old mummies were probably relatives and placed one above the other in different parts of the tomb.

In May 2022, archaeologists reported the discovery of 1,400-year-old remains of the Mayan site so-called Xiol on the outskirts of Mérida. They also uncovered a large central plaza and at least 12 buildings, workshops, burial places of adults and children, and an altar that served a ritual purpose.

In June 2022, archaeologists from the Mexico's National Institute of Anthropology and History (INAH) announced the discovery of a 1,300-year-old nine-inch-tall plaster head statue indicating a young Hun Hunahpu, the Maya’s mythological maize god. The figure's semi-shaved haircut that resembles ripe corn gives reason to the possibility that it is a young maize god. Researchers assume that the Mayan inhabitants of Palenque possibly placed a large stone statuette over a pond to represent the entrance to the underworld. According to archaeologist Arnoldo González Cruz, the Mayan people symbolically shuttered the pool by breaking up some of the plaster and filling it with animal remains, including pottery fragments, carved bone remains, shells, obsidian arrowheads, beads, vegetables, and others.

See also

References